The Golden Reel Award for Outstanding Achievement in Sound Editing – Feature Underscore is an annual award given by the Motion Picture Sound Editors. It honors sound editors whose work has warranted merit in the field of film; in this case, their work in the field of music editing in theatrically released motion pictures. The awards title has gone through many incarnations since its inception, but its focus has been on honoring exemplary work of music editors. Until 2005, animated films had their own category; since then, they have been eligible for this award. In 2022, a category was presented exclusively for documentary features.

Winners and nominees

1990s

2000s

2010s

2020s

References

Golden Reel Awards (Motion Picture Sound Editors)